Selling Solar: The Diffusion of Renewable Energy in Emerging Markets is a 2009 Earthscan book by Damian Miller.  Miller argues that, in order to solve the climate crisis, the world must immediately and dramatically accelerate the commercialization of renewable energy technology. This needs to happen in the industrialized world, as well as in the emerging markets of the developing world where most future greenhouse gas emissions will occur.

Author Damian Miller holds a doctorate from the Judge School of Business, Cambridge, and is the CEO of Orb Energy, which is based in India.

See also
List of books about renewable energy
Clean Tech Nation

References

Environmental non-fiction books
Technology in society
Sustainability books
Renewable energy commercialization
2009 non-fiction books
2009 in the environment
Books about energy issues